Tungokochensky District is an administrative and municipal district (raion), one of the thirty-one in Zabaykalsky Krai, Russia. It is located in the central northern part of the krai, and borders with Kalarsky District in the north, Tungiro-Olyokminsky District in the east, and with Chernyshevsky District in the south. Its administrative center is the rural locality (a selo) of Verkh-Usugli. Population:  14,207 (2002 Census);  The population of Verkh-Usugli accounts for 20.7% of the district's total population.

Geography
The Chersky and Yablonoi ranges stretch from NE to SW across the district, forming the watershed of rivers flowing to the Arctic Ocean on the northern side and rivers flowing to the Pacific Ocean in the southern side. Kontalaksky Golets, the highest peak of the Yablonoi is located in the district, near Tungokochen. On the eastern side rise the western spurs of the Olyokma-Stanovik and at the northern end the western parts of the Kalar and Yankan ranges.

History
The district was established on September 21, 1938. Tungokochen became then the capital of Tungokochensky District. In 1976, the administrative center was moved to the village of Verkh-Usugli. Tungokochen had an airport which was functional until the 1990s. Formerly there was communication by plane, but after the airport closed in the 1990s all the transport is by road, which is difficult in some seasons.

References

Notes

Sources

External links

Districts of Zabaykalsky Krai
States and territories established in 1938

